This is a round-up of the 1993 Sligo Intermediate Football Championship. Ballymote emerged to claim their first Intermediate title, in what was their first final at the grade, defeating fellow first-time finalists St. John's in the decider. The victory secured Ballymote a return to Senior football for the first time since the mid-1960s.

First round

Quarter finals

Semi-finals

Sligo Intermediate Football Championship Final

Sligo Intermediate Football Championship
Sligo Intermediate Football Championship